The following is a production discography of American rapper and record producer Busta Rhymes. It includes a list of songs produced, co-produced and remixed by year, title, artist and album.

Production credits

Remixes

References

External links

Production discographies
Hip hop discographies